This article lists events in 2022 in South Sudan.

Incumbents 

 President: Salva Kiir Mayardit
 Vice President: Riek Machar

Events 

Ongoing – COVID-19 pandemic in South Sudan, South Sudanese Civil War, Sudanese nomadic conflicts, ethnic violence in South Sudan

 January 24 – At least 31 ethnic Dinka people are killed in clashes with suspected Murle armed youth in Jonglei State, South Sudan.
 March 24 – The Sudan People's Liberation Movement-in-Opposition (SPLM-IO) is accused by the South Sudanese military of attacking government positions in Longechuk County. The SPLM-IO says that the military attacked first, causing it to clash with authorities.
 April 14 – At least 42 people are killed during attacks by Arab militiamen in the disputed area of Abyei between Sudan and South Sudan.
 October 11 – The UN Office for the Coordination of Humanitarian Affairs says that renewed fighting between tribes has displaced more than 8,000 civilians in South Sudan.
 December 22 – Footage of the President of South Sudan Salva Kiir urinating on himself during a national event sparks a widespread debate about ethics, age, health, governance and retirement.

See also 

COVID-19 pandemic in Africa
Common Market for Eastern and Southern Africa
East African Community
Community of Sahel–Saharan States
International Conference on the Great Lakes Region

References 

 
2020s in South Sudan
Years of the 21st century in South Sudan
South Sudan
South Sudan